Aimé Vingtrinier (31 July 1812 – 8 April 1903) was a French printer, writer, amateur historian, figure of the 19th-century scholar.
 
He succeeded Léon Boitel as director of the Revue du Lyonnais after he took over the latter's printing press in 1852. He was head librarian of the city of Lyon in 1882.

Publications 

 Fleury Epinat, peintre, 1854
 Traditions populaires comparées: mythologie, règnes de l'air et de la terre. (in collaboration with Désiré Monnier), 1854
 Note sur l'invasion des Sarrasins dans le Lyonnais, 1862
 La Paresse d'un peintre Lyonnais (Anthelme Trimolet), 1866
 Esquisse sur la vie et les travaux de Arthur de Viry, docteur-médecin, 1869
 Histoire du Château de Varey, 1872
 Vieux Papiers d'un imprimeur, 1872,
 Croyances populaires recueillies dans la Franche-Comté, le Lyonnais, la Bresse et le Bugey, 1874
 Paul Saint-Olive, archéologue lyonnais, 1877
 Henri Marchand et le Globe terrestre de la bibliothèque de Lyon, 1878
 La Statuette d'Oyonnax, 1880
 Les Vieux Châteaux de la Bresse et du Bugey, 1882
 À l'école, les bancs, les tables, la santé et l'éducation, 1882
 Lettre au sujet de deux inscriptions lyonnaises du musée de Lyon, 1882
Fantaisies lyonnaises, 1882
Zigzags lyonnais autour du Mont-d'Or, 1884
Histoire de l'imprimerie à Lyon, 1884
Une poype en Bresse, 1885, (read in the Sorbonne, 9 April 1885)
Imprimeurs lyonnais. Jean Pillehotte et sa famille, 1885
Inauguration du buste de Simon Saint-Jean, peintre de fleurs : le 26 juillet 1885, à Millery, 1885
Notice sur Antoine Ponthus-Cinier : peintre lyonnais, 1885
Soliman Pacha - Colonel Sève, généralissime des armées égyptiennes, ou Histoire des guerres de l'Égypte de 1820 à 1860, 1886
Notice sur Hector Allemand : peintre lyonnais, 1887
Un exemplaire d'Hippocrate annoté par Rabelais, 1887 (Le courrier de Lyon et du Sud-Est)
Les incunables de la ville de Lyon et les premiers débuts de l'imprimerie (in collaboration with Marie Pellechet).
De trois anciens voyages en Terre-Sainte, 1888
L'escrime encore et toujours à Lyon (in collaboration with Cavalcabo and Ernest Gayet), 1889
À la mémoire de Joséphin Soulary, 1891
De Lyon à Uriage : épître à madame la marquise de Montrecoul, 1893  
Catalogue de la bibliothèque lyonnaise de M. Coste, 1893
La famille des Jussieu et les deux Alexis, 1896, Correspondance historique et archéologique
Étude populaire sur la Bresse et le Bugey, 1901

Hommages 
Être Lyonnais. Collection : Identité et régionalité. Hommage à Aimé Vingtrinier. Texts collected by Benoit Bruno and Gardes Gilbert. Jacques André Editeur, 4 November 2005, Lyon. , Foreword by Gérard Collomb; postface by Jean-Jack Queyranne.

French printers
Writers from Lyon
1812 births
1903 deaths
Businesspeople from Lyon